Ahmed Shide or Ahmed Shidde, is a Somali-Ethiopian politician and the former chair of the somali political party of the Somali regional state. He is a member of the Federal parliament and was a member of the ruling party Ethiopian Somali People's Democratic Party (ESPDP). Currently an influential member of PM Abiy Ahmed's Prosperity Party. He has also been serving as Minister of Finance in the government of Prime Minister Abiy Ahmed since 2018. Ahmed Shide hails from the Gurre (Gurreh) from Nagayle that is closely related to other Dir nation in the Horn  of Africa including Ethiopia, Djibouti  Somalia and Kenya.

Early life and education 
Ahmed shide was born in Nagele to a less well off Gurre parents belonging to the Madahweyne  a subclan of the Dir Somali. Ahmed completed his primary, secondary and tertiary education in Ethiopia. He holds a Bachelor of Arts in Economics from Ethiopian Civil Service College, Addis Ababa, Ethiopia.

Shide also holds a Masters of Arts in Participation, Development and Social Change from the Institute of Development Studies, University of Sussex, United Kingdom, Post-Graduate Diploma in Managing Rural Resources and Resource Conflicts from the Institute of Social Studies, The Hague, the Netherlands, and MBA from Greenwich University, London, United Kingdom.

Career 
Before assuming office as minister of finance, Shide served as Minister of Transport and also as Minister of Government Communication Affairs of Ethiopia. Even before that he served as state minister of the ministry of finance and economic development for more than eight years, where he led the countries economic cooperation and regional development and integration agenda. He was the one who championed and spearheaded the economic reform of Ethiopia and contributed to the significant development achievements of the country recorded over the past decades. At the moment he is the one leading the economic reform, which aims at boosting private participation and better economic efficiency. He also served the government at regional state level.

Shide assumed the office of Minister of Finance on 16 October 2018, replacing Abraham Tekeste. By mid-2019, he proposed to parliament 386.9 billion birr ($13.48 billion) in government spending for the 2019/2020 budget. Also during his time in office, Ethiopia announced plans to split its state telecoms provider Ethio telecom into two business units along infrastructure and service sector lines before it is privatized. In late 2020, he oversaw negotiations with the International Monetary Fund on a $2.9 billion programme, one of the biggest in the fund’s history in Africa. 

In addition to his role in government, Shide has been a member of the World Bank Group’s (WBG) Advisory Council on Gender and Development.

Other activities
 African Development Bank (AfDB), Ex-Officio Member of the Board of Governors (since 2018)
 World Bank, Ex-Officio Member of the Board of Governors (since 2018)

References

Living people
Finance ministers of Ethiopia
21st-century Ethiopian politicians
Year of birth missing (living people)
Ethiopian people of Somali descent
Alumni of the University of Greenwich
Alumni of the University of Sussex